In the Nick is a 1960 British comedy film directed by Ken Hughes and starring Anthony Newley, Anne Aubrey, Bernie Winters, James Booth and Harry Andrews. In the film, a gang of incompetent criminals are placed in a special type of new prison. Featured song Must Be was written by Lionel Bart.

Plot
A progressive experimental prison without bars is run by young psychiatrist Dr. Newcombe (Anthony Newley) and harsh but fair Chief Officer Williams (Harry Andrews). Four hardened criminals, the Spider Gang, arrive at this minimum security prison, the leader of whom is Spider Kelly (James Booth). Dr. Newcombe has his work cut out trying to reform the boys and enlists the aid of Spider's girlfriend  Doll (Anne Aubrey), who, to Spider's anger, is now working as a stripper in Soho. Newcombe seems to be straightening Spider out, while Spider is in turn sorting out a rival imprisoned gang, led by Ted Ross (Ian Hendry), who hold the monopoly in smuggled cigarettes.

Cast
 Anthony Newley - Dr. Newcombe
 Anne Aubrey - The Doll
 Bernie Winters - Jinx Shortbottom
 James Booth - Spider Kelly
 Harry Andrews - Chief Officer Williams
 Al Mulock - Dancer
 Derren Nesbitt - Mick
 Niall MacGinnis - Prison Governor
 Victor Brooks - Screw Smith
 Ian Hendry - Ted Ross
 Kynaston Reeves - Judge
 Barry Keegan - Screw Jenkins
 Diana Chesney - Barmaid
 Andria Lawrence (uncredited)
 Sam Kydd - Inmate

Production
Many of the same team had just made Jazz Boat.

Critical reception
The Monthly Film Bulletin noted  "A sequel to Jazz Boat, with the same leading characters and production team, In the Nick is cast very much in the same mould--easy-going mixture of farce and fantasy, loose and ingenuous scripting, excellent (if bizarre) team-playing.  James Booth stands out for his genuinely observed portrait of Spider, Bernie Winters appears to be one of those rare comedians who can keep his moronic style of clowning free from offensiveness, and Niall MacGinnis (Governor), Harry Andrews (Chief Officer) and Ian Hendry (rival mobsters) all catch the eye.  Anthony Newley is rather at sea as a psychiatrist, but plays with a likable modesty and warmth, and an improved Anne Aubrey discretely burlesques Jayne Mansfield.  There is much in this film that is conventionally weak and structurally uneven, yet it gets closer to contemporary feeling than numerous more ambitious comedies.  The dialogue, particularly, strikes an authentic note, and Ken Hughes' debt to Frank Norman, who wrote the original story, seems considerable." while TV Guide noted, "Though there are some genuinely funny moments in the film, Newley is miscast as the compassionate psychologist. Though relatively straightforward for its first half, the plot becomes convoluted and the motivations are twisted in the second half."

References

External links

1960 films
1960s English-language films
Films directed by Ken Hughes
1960 comedy films
British comedy films
1960s British films